The 2020 Alsco 300 was a NASCAR Xfinity Series race held on May 25, 2020 at Charlotte Motor Speedway in Concord, North Carolina. Contested over 203 laps—extended from 200 laps due to an overtime finish, on the  asphalt speedway, it was the sixth race of the 2020 NASCAR Xfinity Series season. Cup Series driver Kyle Busch took home his first Xfinity Series victory of the year.

Report

Background 

The race was held at Charlotte Motor Speedway, which is located in Concord, North Carolina. The speedway complex includes a 1.5-mile (2.4 km) quad-oval track, as well as a dragstrip and a dirt track. The speedway was built in 1959 by Bruton Smith and is considered the home track for NASCAR, as many race teams are based in the Charlotte metropolitan area. The track is owned and operated by Speedway Motorsports Inc. (SMI), with Marcus G. Smith serving as track president.

Because to the ongoing COVID-19 pandemic, a 260-spectator limit was imposed, as owners of the 52 condominium owners in Turn 1 were given five tickets to the race, with all staying inside during the race.

Entry list 

 (R) denotes rookie driver.
 (i) denotes driver who is ineligible for series driver points.

Qualifying 
Ross Chastain was awarded the pole for the race as determined by a random draw.

Starting Lineup

Race

Race results

Stage Results 
Stage One

Laps: 45

Stage Two

Laps: 45

Final Stage Results 

Laps: 110

Race statistics 

 Lead changes: 20 among 5 different drivers
 Cautions/Laps: 11 for 53
 Red flags: 0
 Time of race: 2 hours, 43 minutes, 30 seconds
 Average speed:

Media

Television 
The Alsco 300 was carried by FS1 in the United States. Adam Alexander, Stewart-Haas Racing driver Clint Bowyer, and Jamie McMurray called the race from the Fox Sports Studio in Charlotte, with Matt Yocum covering pit road.

Radio 
The Performance Racing Network (PRN) called the race for radio, which was simulcast on SiriusXM NASCAR Radio. Doug Rice and Mark Garrow anchored the action from the booth. Rob Albright called the action from Turns 1 & 2 and Pat Patterson called the race through turns 3 & 4. Brad Gillie, Brett McMillan, and Wendy Venturini provided reports from pit road.

Standings after the race 

 Drivers' Championship standings

 Note: Only the first 12 positions are included for the driver standings.
 . – Driver has clinched a position in the NASCAR playoffs.

References 

2020 NASCAR Xfinity Series
Alsco 300
Alsco
2020 in sports in North Carolina
NASCAR races at Charlotte Motor Speedway